The Premios 40 Principales for Best International Artist is an honor presented annually at the Los 40 Principales award show.

References

2011 music awards